The Mambwe and Lungu peoples living at the southern end of Lake Tanganyika in Tanzania and Zambia speak a common language with minor dialectical differences. Perhaps half of the Fipa people to their north speak it as a native language. When spoken by the Fipa, it is called "Fipa-Mambwe"; this is also the term for the branch of Bantu languages which includes Fipa and Mambwe-Lungu.

Mambwe language is spoken by the people who are found in Rukwa region, southern Sumbawanga town. It is a language which is one of the three dialects spoken by the indigenous people of Rukwa Region. People of this region speak Fipa, Mambwe and Kinyiha.
Mambwe language is spoken likely to Fipa but there variation in which some terms are understood among the speaker of these two languages
Mambwe language is also spoken in some parts of Zambia as their mother tongue although they differ in manners of articulation.

References

Relevant literature
Halemba, Andrzej. 2005. Religious and Ethical Values in the Proverbs of the Mambwe People (Zambia). Vol. 1. Poland.
Werner, A. and A. N. Tucker. 1940. Mambwe Proverbs. Bulletin of the School of Oriental Studies 10.2 (1940), pp. 455-467.

External links
 small Mambwe–English dictionary

Rukwa languages
Languages of Zambia
Languages of Tanzania